Jean-François Fournel (1745-21 July 1820) was a French jurisprudent.

References 
 Fournel, Jean François i Nordisk familjebok (andra upplagan, 1908)

1820 deaths
French non-fiction writers
19th-century French writers
1745 births